This article shows the rosters of all participating teams at the 2018 FIVB Volleyball Women's Club World Championship in Shaoxing, China.

Pool A

Vakıfbank İstanbul
The following is the roster of the Turkish club Vakıfbank İstanbul in the 2018 FIVB Volleyball Women's Club World Championship.

 Head coach:  Giovanni Guidetti

Minas Tênis Clube
The following is the roster of the Brazilian club Minas Tênis Clube in the 2018 FIVB Volleyball Women's Club World Championship.

 Head coach:  Stefano Lavarini

Zhejiang WVC
The following is the roster of the Chinese club Zhejiang WVC in the 2018 FIVB Volleyball Women's Club World Championship.

 Head coach:  Wang Hebin

Volero Le Cannet
The following is the roster of the French club Volero Le Cannet in the 2018 FIVB Volleyball Women's Club World Championship.

 Head coach:  Avital Selinger

Pool B

Eczacıbaşı VitrA İstanbul
The following is the roster of the Turkish club Eczacıbaşı VitrA İstanbul in the 2018 FIVB Volleyball Women's Club World Championship.

 Head coach:  Marco Aurélio Motta

Praia Clube
The following is the roster of the Brazilian club Praia Clube in the 2018 FIVB Volleyball Women's Club World Championship.

 Head coach:  Paulo Coco

Supreme Chonburi
The following is the roster of the Thai club Supreme Chonburi in the 2018 FIVB Volleyball Women's Club World Championship.

 Head coach:  Nataphon Srisamutnak

Altay VC
The following is the roster of the Kazakh club Altay VC in the 2018 FIVB Volleyball Women's Club World Championship.

 Head coach:  Yury Panchenko

References

External links
Official website

2018 in women's volleyball
C